Rime may refer to:

Rime ice, ice that forms when water droplets in fog freeze to the outer surfaces of objects, such as trees

Rime is also an alternative spelling of "rhyme" as a noun:

Syllable rime, term used in the study of phonology in linguistics
Rime dictionary, type of ancient Chinese dictionary used for writing poetry
Rime table, a syllable chart of the Chinese language
Rime riche, a form of rhyme using identical sounds

Literature 

The Rime of the Ancient Mariner, a 1798 poem by Samuel Taylor Coleridge
Le Rime, a collection of lyrical poems by Dante Alighieri
The Rime of King William, a poetic eulogy of William the Conqueror written in Old English

Other uses 

Noémi Rime, French opera singer
Rimé movement, an ecumenical movement within Tibetan Buddhism
RelayNet International Mail Exchange (RIME), an e-mail exchange networking protocol
Rime (video game), an action-adventure video game

See also
Rhyme, a repetition of identical or similar sounds in two or more different words
 Rimes, a surname